Alfred Ernest Catlin (18 August 1875 – 13 September 1944) was an Australian rules footballer who played for the Collingwood Football Club in the Victorian Football League (VFL).

Notes

External links 

		
Alf Catlin's profile at Collingwood Forever

1875 births
1944 deaths
Australian rules footballers from Victoria (Australia)
Collingwood Football Club players
Maryborough Football Club players